Murat Şahin (born 4 February 1976, Istanbul) is a retired Turkish football goalkeeper.

Career
Şahin began his career in Göztepe Hilalspor where he was watched by scouts. At the age of 17, he had been transferred to Fenerbahçe and turned professional when he was 18 years old. He spent 7 seasons in Sarı Kanaryalar until he was transferred to Konyaspor in the 1998/99 mid-season transfer window.

After periods in several clubs in the Turkish League, he moved back to Istanbul by way of a transfer to Beşiktaş in the 2004/05 pre-season transfer market as an experienced keeper.

Uche Incident
During his time in Fenerbahçe, he was the 2nd keeper behind Rüştü. In the 1999/2000 season, he had a decent chance to play against Beşiktaş after Rüştü cut his hand just before the match. Thus, he had his place in the Istanbul derby, but regrettably, an unfortunate moment happened whereby Şahin broke his team-mate Uche's leg when trying to gather the ball in the box.

One legged keeper
He had his most notable performance on the 29th match day of the Turkish League on 22 April 2007 against Antalyaspor, when first choice goalkeeper Vedran Runje was suspended. Şahin played well and didn't concede, despite picking up a serious injury on his knee ligaments in the second half. The final score was 1–0 for Beşiktaş as the team gained 3 crucial points to ensure Champions League participation for the following season.

Şahin was transferred to southern Turkey club Gaziantepspor during the transfer window of the Turkish League 2007/08 season.

Honours

Club
Beşiktaş
Turkish Cup: 2005–06, 2006–07
Turkish Super Cup: 2006

International
Turkey
 FIFA Confederations Cup 2003: Third place

References

External links

 

1976 births
Living people
Turkish footballers
2003 FIFA Confederations Cup players
Süper Lig players
Gaziantepspor footballers
Fenerbahçe S.K. footballers
Beşiktaş J.K. footballers
Çaykur Rizespor footballers
Adanaspor footballers
Vanspor footballers
Konyaspor footballers
Diyarbakırspor footballers
Kasımpaşa S.K. footballers
Association football goalkeepers